Singapore's grading system in schools is differentiated by the existence of many types of institutions with different education foci and systems. The grading systems that are used at Primary, Secondary, and Junior College levels are the most fundamental to the local education system.

Primary schools
Primary schools in Singapore implement a grading system along with an "Achievement Band" until the system disregarded the EM3 stream and concentrated on an "Overall Grade" scheme, which grades students as below. From 2021 onwards, the Primary 6 Cohorts will also be using the Achievement Level system (AL) which will be used for the PSLE:
 AL1:90 to 100
 AL2 :85 to 89
 AL3 :80 to 84
 AL4: 75 to 79
 AL5: 65 to 74
 AL6: 45 to 64
 AL7: 20 to 44
 AL8: 0 to 20

Primary 5 to 6 (Foundation)
 AL-A [equal to AL-6]: 75+
 AL-B [equal to AL-7]: 30-74
 AL-C [equal to AL-8]: 29 or less

Secondary schools
Secondary schools are the first institutions in Singapore to have implemented the “Overall Grade” grading system for academic subjects. Since the 2000s, the education system allows more capable Normal (Academic) stream students to participate in the O Levels examination for Mother Tongue and Mathematics (Elementary) a year instead of taking the N Levels equivalents. This has resulted with a quasi-O Levels grading system used for such students, although their N Levels subjects are graded along the Overall Grade grading system, thus in their result slip, some subjects will be graded along the Overall Grade, and some with the O Levels grading system.

Express and Special stream students are graded along the Overall Grade grading system for the first 3 academic years in their secondary schools, and then graded along the O Levels grading system in their final secondary school year (year 4). Normal (Academic) students are graded for first 3 academic years and the N Levels year (year 4), and subsequently graded along the O Levels grading system in their final secondary school year (year 5). Normal (Technical) stream students are graded along the Overall Grade grading system throughout their entire education in secondary schools.

Overall grade
 A1: 75% - 100%
 A2: 70% - 74%
 B3: 65% - 69%
 B4: 60% - 64%
 C5: 55% - 59%
 C6: 50% - 54%
 D7: 45% - 49%
 E8: 40% - 44%
 F9:  0% - 39%

GPA and MSG

In some Secondary Schools, the Grade Point Average (GPA) grading system is used. The GPA is usually calculated by taking the Grade Point of each subject, adding them together, then dividing the total by that number of subjects. The actual subjects counted towards the GPA computation differs between schools. For example, Victoria School gives its students the option to exclude applicable subjects from the GPA computation depending on the subject combination of the student. This GPA value is rounded to two decimal places, giving the student's GPA. A minimum GPA of 3.0 and a pass in English Language and Mathematics will usually be required for promotion

For example, the GPA table for Raffles Girls' School and Raffles Institution (Secondary)  is as follows:

For example, the GPA table for Victoria School (Integrated Programme) is as follows:

However, the GPA table may differ from schools to schools and tracks. 

However, in other secondary schools like Hwa Chong Institution, St. Joseph's Institution, School of Science and Technology, and Victoria School (Express), a similar grading system called the Mean Subject Grade (MSG) is used. The MSG table is as follows:

The MSG is calculated by adding the points together and dividing the sum by the number of subjects. For example, if a student scored an A1 for math, B4 for English, and C6 for Chemistry, his MSG would be  = .

This will be rounded to two decimal places, giving a final MSG of 3.67

N(T)levels grades
 A: 70% and above
 B: 65% to 69%
 C: 60% to 64%
 D: 50% to 59%
 U: Below 49%, considered failed
N Level grading from last year onwards

O levels grades
 A1: 75% and above
 A2: 70% to 74%
 B3: 65% to 69%
 B4: 60% to 64%
 C5: 55% to 59%
 C6: 50% to 54%
 D7: 45% to 49%
 E8: 40% to 44%
 F9: Below 40%
 Grades D7, E8 and F9 are considered the failing grades. Students taking Mother Tongue Syllabus B may be awarded a Merit, a Pass, or an Ungraded grade.

Junior college level (GCE A and AO levels)
 A: 70% or Above
 B: 60% to 69%
 C: 55% to 59%
 D: 50% to 54%
 E: 45% to 49% (passing grade)
 S: 40% to 44% (denotes standard is at AO level only), grade N in the British A Levels.
 U: 39% to 0% (no points are given)

In addition, students offering Special Papers (offered for the last time in 2006) will be awarded either 1 (Distinction), 2 (Merit), or U (Unclassified). Grades 1 and 2 may only be awarded with a grade E and above in the main A level paper.  Grade U will be awarded if a candidate fails to achieve at least a grade E in the main subject paper, and will not be reflected in the A level result certificate.

For students offering H3 Subjects (introduced for the first time in 2006), they will be awarded either Distinction, Merit, Pass or Ungraded. However, this would not affect the final score of the candidate.

Different JCs have different expectations and thus, the school reserves the discretion to moderate the marks when deemed necessary. For example, some JCs may regard 50% as the passing mark instead of 45% by others.

Note: AO level grades at Junior College level follows the O level system above.

All percentages with their corresponding grades shown here are just approximate guidelines because ultimately at the end of all major examinations (Primary School Leaving Examinations or PSLE in short, GCE N, O and A Levels) the Ministry of Education, Singapore, will moderate the results. Hence, an A grade for instance may no longer be at 70%. It could possibly be 68% or even 73% depending on the performance of the cohort. This is usually done to prevent grade inflation.

In addition, some schools are also offering the International Baccalaureate diploma program.

The grades obtained for each A-level exam subject will be converted into rank points (RP) and added together for admissions to university. The maximum number of RP for admissions to university a student can achieve is 90. A higher score (out of 90) would place a student in a better position for admissions to university. For entrance into a local university, refer to the Indicative Grade Profile for each University.

Polytechnic (diploma)

Note: Some polytechnics do not have grades such as AD with A being the highest grade such as Republic Polytechnic during 2007 to 2010.

Grading
AD/Z: Distinction (Top 5% score in the subject for the cohort)
A: Excellent (>=80%)
B+: Very good (75%-79%)
B: Good (70%-74%)
C+: Above average (65%-69%)
C: Average (60%-64%)
D+: Pass (55%-59%)
D: Borderline pass (50%-54%)
F: Fail (<50%)

Grade point average
AD/Z: 4.0
A: 4.0
B+: 3.5
B: 3.0
C+: 2.5
C: 2.0
D+: 1.5
D: 1.0
F: 0.0

For entrance into local public funded university, refer to the Indicative Grade Profile for each University. Generally, a good GPA is considered 3.5 and above and that does not guarantee that you will get the course that you want as certain popular courses requires extremely high GPA even as it may be considerable easier to study. Currently, only 8 percent of polytechnic students enter established local university like NUS, NTU and SMU. To cater for the increasing aspirations of polytechnic graduates, new Universities such as the Singapore Institute of Technology (SIT) have been established.

Co-curricular activity (CCA) was also taken into consideration for matriculation. However, from 2007 onwards, local universities have since scrapped the 5% CCA criteria. This means that polytechnic results would comprise 80% while the remaining 20% is made up of O Levels grade. Some secondary schools also use the Grade Point Average of the polytechnic Diploma system.

University (degree) 
Universities in Singapore adopt the Grade Point Average (GPA) system. Each module are individually graded and the cumulative grade point is averaged out at the end of the course which a student takes. However, different universities have different computation schemes. National University of Singapore (NUS), Nanyang Technological University (NTU) and Singapore University of Technology and Design (SUTD) adopt schemes that compute up to 5.0 grade point. However, Singapore Management University (SMU) adopts a 4-point computation scheme. 

The maximum average grade point for the 4-point computation is 4.0 while the maximum for the 5-point computation is 5.0.

References

Singapore
Education in Singapore
Grading